Aristelliger is a genus of Caribbean geckos in the family Sphaerodactylidae, commonly known as croaking geckos or Caribbean geckos. The nine named species in the genus are native to various islands in the West Indies, though the species A. georgeensis is also found on mainland Belize. Aristelliger species are nocturnal and mostly arboreal, occupying palm tree trunks and other vertical surfaces. They are among the largest neotropical geckos, with A. lar reaching up to 135 mm (5.3 inches) in snout-vent-length (not including the tail). They are primarily insectivorous, feeding on a variety of arthropods. Cannibalism of eggs and hatchlings has been reported in A. cochranae. A. lar is omnivorous, and may be an important seed disperser for fruits of the plant Marcgravia. Many species of Aristelliger are accustomed to living among human structures, though several are threatened by urban and agricultural development or invasive species.

Species

Nota bene: A binomial authority in parentheses indicates that the species was originally described in a genus other than Aristelliger.

References

Further reading
Cope ED (1862). "On the Genera Panoplus, Centropyx, Aristelliger and Sphærodactylus ". Proc. Acad. Nat. Sci. Philadelphia 13: 494-500. (Aristelliger, new genus, pp. 496–497).

 
Lizard genera
Lizards of the Caribbean
Taxa named by Edward Drinker Cope